The Vuelta Ciclista de Chile is an annual Chilean elite men's professional road cycling stage race first held in 1976.

History

References

External links
Official site
cyclingnews

 
UCI America Tour races
Recurring sporting events established in 1976
1976 establishments in Chile
Summer events in Chile